Dampiera teres, commonly known as the terete-leaved dampiera, is an erect perennial herb in the family Goodeniaceae. The species, which is endemic to Western Australia north of Perth.

References

teres
Eudicots of Western Australia
Plants described in 1839
Endemic flora of Western Australia